WGRE (91.5 FM) is a non-commercial educational radio station licensed to serve Greencastle, Indiana, United States.  The station, established in 1949, is owned by DePauw University.  WGRE broadcasts a college radio format.  The station consistently ranks as one of the top college radio stations in the country.

References

External links
WGRE official website

GRE
Radio stations established in 1949
Putnam County, Indiana
DePauw University
1949 establishments in Indiana